Az-Zumar ("The Troops, The Throngs") is the 39th chapter (surah) of the Qur'an, the central religious text of Islam. It contains 75 verses (ayat). This surah derives its name from the Arabic word zumar (troops) that occurs in verses 71 and 73. Regarding the timing and contextual background of the believed revelation (asbāb al-nuzūl), it is believed to have been revealed in the mid-Maccan period when persecutions of the Muslim believers by the polytheists had escalated.

The surah expounds the signs of God's Oneness (tawhid) in the natural world and emphasizes the absurdity of associating partners with God. It also hints at emigration for the believers who were suffering great difficulties in worshiping God in their homeland. It also declares that there can be no reconciliation between believing in God's Oneness and association partners with God. The chapter also reminds readers of the other world, where Muslims believe people will see the outcome of their own deeds.

Summary
1-2 The Quran a revelation from God to Muhammad
2-3 Muhammad to exhibit a pure religion to God
4-5 God will not show favour to idolaters
6 God Hath not chosen to have a son
7-8 God manifest in His works of creation and providence
9-10 God is Sovereign in His dealings with men
11 The ingratitude of idolaters
12 The righteous and wicked not equal before God
13 The righteous shall be rewarded
14-16 Muhammad, the first Muslim, must exhibit the pure religion of God
17-18 The loss of the idolaters
19 Idolaters who repent shall be rewarded
20 Muhammad cannot deliver the reprobate
21 The reward of the faithful
22 God revealed in the growth and decay of Nature
23 The Muslim and the infidel not equal
24 The Quran first frightens, then comforts, the Muslims
25 The punishment of the wicked in hell
26-27 Former infidels punished for maligning their prophets
28-30 Every kind of parable in the Quran
31-32 Muhammad and the infidels shall debate before the Lord
33-36 The reward and punishment of believers and unbelievers
37 The infidels of Makkah threaten Muhammad
37-38 True believers shall be rightly directed
39 Idolaters acknowledge God as creator
40-42 Muhammad yet to be vindicated
43 God shall raise the dead as he raiseth from sleep
44-45 None can intercede except by God’s permission
46 Idolaters dread God but joy in their false gods
47 God shall judge between the faithful and the idolaters
48 Idolaters will give two worlds to escape God’s wrath
49-50 They shall not escape the evils of the judgment-day
51-52 The infidels of former times were punished
52-53 The idolaters of Makkah shall not escape
54-56 Idolaters exhorted to repent; their sin will be forgiven
57-59 The regrets of the impenitent at the judgment-day
60-61 God shall reject their apologies and blacken their faces for the ones who lied. (Warning verse to those who lie about God).
62 But He will save the righteous
63 God the Sovereign Ruler of heaven and earth
64-66 Muhammad cannot worship idols, seeing he has received a revelation from God
67 The resurrection and the judgment-day, fearful scenes of Qiyamah
68 The blowing of the Armageddon trumpet, when every creatures and creations will meet their death, except those chosen by Allah to survive the Qiamah According to several tafsir scholars, the creature who destined to survive from the Armageddon trumpet blow were Israfil, an archangel who blow the trumpet himself. Israfil were also said to be one of gigantic archangels who bear the throne of Allah. According to a Hadith sourced from Anas ibn Malik which narrated by Ibn Mawardayh and al-Firyabi, Al-Suyuti narrated those who survived from the blow of the Israfil trumpet were Israfil, Jibril, Mikail, Bearers of the Throne, and the Archangel of death.
69 The resurrection and the judgment-day, fearful scenes of Qiyamah
70-73 Troop of the righteous and wicked, their reward and punishment
74-75 God shall be praised by righteous men and angels

Exegesis (tafsir)

9:5 He wraps the night over the day 
Translation: He created the heavens and earth in truth. He wraps the night over the day and wraps the day over the night and has subjected the sun and the moon, each running [its course] for a specified term. Unquestionably, He is the Exalted in Might, the Perpetual Forgiver.

According to Turkish writer Ali Ünal: the word "wraps" in this verse is a simile, which alludes both to the earth's being rounded and to differences in the times of sunrise and sunset.

References

External links

Quran 39 Clear Quran translation
Az-Zumar (Google translate), corresponding article in Arabic Wikipedia
Q39:1, 50+ translations, islamawakened.com

Zumar
Islamic mythology